Sex differences in religion can be classified as either "internal" or "external". Internal religious issues are studied from the perspective of a given religion, and might include religious beliefs and practices about the roles and rights of men and women in government, education and worship; beliefs about the sex or gender of deities and religious figures; and beliefs about the origin and meaning of human gender. External religious issues can be broadly defined as an examination of a given religion from an outsider's perspective, including possible clashes between religious leaders and laity; and the influence of, and differences between, religious perspectives on social issues.

Gender of deities 

The earliest documented religions, and some contemporary animist religions, involve the deification of characteristics of the natural world. These spirits are typically, but not always, gendered. It has been proposed, since the 19th century, that polytheism arose out of animism, as religious epic provided personalities to autochthonous animist spirits in various parts of the world, notably in the development of ancient near eastern and Indo-European literature. Polytheistic gods are also typically gendered. The earliest evidence of monotheism is the worship of the goddess Eurynome, Aten in Egypt, the teaching of Moses in the Torah and Zoroastrianism in Persia. Aten, Yahweh and Ahura Mazda are all masculine deities, embodied only in metaphor, so masculine rather than reproductively male.

Hinduism

Kali, the Hindu goddess of both the life cycle and destructive war, breaks the gender role of women representing love, sex, fertility, and beauty. This Hindu deity reflects the modern view of feminism through their depiction of female strength.

Christianity

In Christianity, one entity of the Trinity, the Son, is believed to have become incarnate as a human male. Christians have traditionally believed that God the Father has masculine gender rather than male sex because the Father has never been incarnated. By contrast, there is less historical consensus on the gender of the Holy Spirit.

Islam

In Islam, God is not gendered literally or metaphorically. God is referred to with the masculine pronoun in Arabic [Huwa or 'He'], as there is no neuter in the Arabic language. Ascribing natural gender to God is considered heretical because God is described as incomparable to creation. The Quran says: There is nothing like Him, and He ˹alone˺ is the All-Hearing, All-Seeing.

In contrast to Christian theology, Jesus is viewed as a prophet rather than a human male incarnation of God, and the primary sources of Islam [the Quran and Sunnah] do not refer to God as the 'Father'.

Creation myths about human gender 
In many stories, man and woman are created at the same time, with equal standing. One example is the creation story in Genesis 1: "And God created the man in his image. In the image of God he created him.  Male and female he created them." Some commentators interpret the parallelism to be deliberately stressing that mankind is, in some sense, a "unity in diversity" from a divine perspective (compare e pluribus unum),
and that women as well as men are included in God's image. The first man, Adam, has been viewed as a spiritual being or an ideal who can be distinguished as both male and female; an androgynous being with no sex. Pierre Chaunu argues that Genesis' gender-inclusive conception of humanity contrasts sharply with the views of gender found in older literature from surrounding cultures, and suggests a higher status of women in western society due to Judæo-Christian influence, and based on this verse. Some scholars, such as Philo, argue that the "sexes" were developed through an accidental division of the "true self" which existed prior to being assigned with gender.

In other accounts, man is created first, followed by woman. This is the case in the creation account of Genesis 2, where the first woman (Eve) is created from the rib of the first man (Adam), as a companion and helper. These two gender creation stories imagine the ideal of the unitary self. However, the unitary self is either androgynous or physically male; both of which are masculine in configuration.

In Plato's Symposium, Aristophanes provides an account to explain gender and romantic attraction.
There were originally three sexes: the all-male, the all-female, and the "androgynous", who was half man, half woman.  As punishment for attacking the gods, each was split in half.  The halves of the androgynous being became heterosexual men and women, while the halves of the all-male and all-female became gays and lesbians, respectively.

Leadership roles 

Some religions restrict leadership to males. The ordination of women has been a controversial issue in some religions where either the rite of ordination, or the role that an ordained person fulfills, has traditionally been restricted to men because of cultural or theological prohibitions.

Beginning in the 19th century, some Christian denominations have ordained women.

Some Islamic communities (mainly outside the Middle East) have recently appointed women as imams, normally with ministries restricted to leading women in prayer and other charitable ministries.

Dharmic religions 

Both masculine and feminine deities feature prominently in Hinduism. The identity of the Vedic writers is not known, but the first hymn of the Rigveda is addressed to the masculine deity Agni, and the pantheon of the Vedas is dominated by masculine gods. The most prominent Avatars of Vishnu are men.

Mostly, the traditional religious leaders of Jainism are men. The 19th tirthankara (traditional leader) Māllīnātha in this half cycle was female.

Siddhartha Gautama (the Buddha) was a man, but the female Buddha Vajrayogini also plays a role in Buddhism. In some East Asian Buddhist communities, a number of women are ordained as monks as well.

Abrahamic religions 
In Abrahamic religions, Abraham himself, Moses, David and Elijah are among the most significant leaders documented according to the traditions of the Hebrew Bible. John the Baptist, Jesus and his apostles, and Saul of Tarsus again give the New Testament an impression of the founders and key figures of Christianity being male dominated. They were followed by a millennium of theologians known as the Church Fathers. Islam was founded by Muhammad, and his successor Abu Bakr, Umar, Uthman ibn Affan and Ali, for Sunnis and Ali ibn Abi Talib and The Twelve Imams for those of Shia faith, were also men. On the other hand, The Virgin Mary, the mother of Jesus of Nazareth, is not associated with leadership or teaching, but is nonetheless a key figure in Catholicism. Fatimah, daughter of Muhammad is regarded by Muslims as an exemplar for men and women.

The Baháʼí Faith, a fast growing religion, teaches that men and women are equal. Prominent women celebrated in Baháʼí history include Bahíyyih Khánum, who acted head of the faith for several periods during the ministries of `Abdu'l-Bahá and Shoghi Effendi, and Táhirih, who is also held by Baháʼís as a penultimate leader. Women serve in higher percentages of leadership in appointed and elected national and international institutions of the religion than in the general population. However, only men are allowed to be members of the religion's highest governing body, the Universal House of Justice.

Nakayama Miki was the founder of Tenrikyo, which may be the largest religion to have a woman founder. Ellen G. White was instrumental to the founding of the Seventh-day Adventist Church and is officially considered a prophet by Seventh-day Adventists.

Segregation 

Many religions have traditionally practiced sex segregation.

In traditional Jewish synagogues, the women's section is separated from the men's section by a wall or curtain called a mechitza. Men are not permitted to pray in the presence of women, to prevent distraction. The mechitza shown in the picture on the right is one in a synagogue affiliated with the 'left wing' (more modern side) of Modern Orthodox Judaism, which requires the mechitza to be of the height shown in the picture. More traditional or 'right wing' Modern Orthodox Judaism, and all forms of Haredi Judaism, requires the mechitza to be of a type which absolutely prevents the men from seeing the women.

Enclosed religious orders are usually segregated by gender.

Sex segregation in Islam includes guidelines on interaction between men and women. Men and women also worship in different areas in most mosques. Both men and women cover their awra when in the presence of members of the opposite sex (who are not close relations).

Roles in marriage 
Nearly all religions recognize marriage, and many religions also promote views on appropriate gender roles within marriage.

Christianity 

Within Christianity, two notable views on gender roles in a marriage are complementarianism and egalitarianism. The complementarian view of marriage is widely accepted in Christianity, where the husband is viewed as the leader and the wife is viewed as the follower. Essentially, the man is given more of a headship role and the woman is viewed as a supporting partner. In Genesis 3, Adam named his wife Eve ("life") because she "was the mother of all living".

In mainstream Christian tradition, the relationship between a husband and wife is believed to mirror the relationship between Christ and the Church. This can be seen in Ephesians 5:25:

The man, Christian traditionalists assert, is meant to be a living martyr for his wife, "giving himself up for her" daily and through acts of unselfish love. The woman, on the other hand, is meant to be a helper.

While complementarianism has been the norm for years, some Christians have moved toward egalitarian views. As the nature of gender roles within societies changes, religious views on gender roles in marriage change as well.

Islam 

In Islam, a woman's primary responsibility is usually interpreted as fulfilling her role as a wife and mother, whereas women still have the right and are free to work. A man's role is to work and be able to protect and financially support his wife and family.

In regards to guidelines in marriage, a man is allowed to marry a Muslim, Jewish, Sabaean, or Christian woman whereas a woman is only allowed to marry a Muslim man. Both genders cannot marry nonbelievers or polytheists.

The matter of divorce is discussed in verse 2:228 of the Qu'ran. The Qu'ran instructs women to wait at least three menstrual periods, called Iddah, before committing to a second marriage. The purpose of the Iddah is to ensure that a woman's pregnancy will be linked to the correct biological father. In the case of a Talāq, which is a divorce initiated by the man, the man is supposed to announce the words "I divorce you" aloud three times, each separated by a three-month waiting period. Certain practices of the Talāq divorce allows the "I divorce you" utterance to be completed in one sitting; however, the concept of "Triple Divorce" in one sitting is considered wrong in some branches of Islam such as with the Shia Muslims. During the three-month waiting period, only the man has the right to initiate a marital reunion if both sides desire to reconcile. This yields a gender equality perspective in the sense that women have power over men in regards to finance parallel to how men have power over women in regards to obedience, both of which are only valid to a reasonable extent. While a Ṭalāq can be completed easily, a divorce that is initiated by the woman, called a Khula, is harder to obtain due to a woman's requirement to repay her dowry and give up child custody. More specifically, a woman is to give up custody of her child if the child is over the age of seven. If a woman gains custody of her child who is under the age of seven, she must still forfeit custody upon the child's seventh birthday. Although the Islamic religion requires the woman to repay her dowry, she is also entitled to receive financial support from her former husband if needed. This cycle of financial matters protects the woman's property from being taken advantage of during or after marriage.

Cultural effects on religious practice 
Religious worship may vary by individual due to differing cultural experiences of gender.

Greco-Roman Paganism 
Both men and women who practiced paganism in ancient civilizations such as Rome and Greece worshiped male and female deities, but goddesses played a much larger role in women's lives. Roman and Greek goddesses' domains often aligned with culturally specific gender expectations at the time which served to perpetrate them in many cases. One such expectation of women was to marry at a relatively young age. The quadrennial Bear Festival, known as Arkteia, was held on the outskirts of Athens in honor of Artemis and involved girls ages seven to fourteen. The girls would compete in public athletic events as Greek men sat as onlookers, observing potential wives.

Demeter, the goddess of fertility, was a prominent deity due to women's ability to relate to her. The myth surrounding Demeter involves her losing her daughter, Persephone, against her will to Hades and the grief she experiences after the event. Mother-daughter relationships were very important to ancient Greeks. The severance of this relationship by fathers and husbands created much strain in young women who were forced to leave their mothers, submit to their husbands, and yield to the patriarchal society. Demeter was honored through female-exclusive ceremonies in various rituals due to her general disdain for the behaviors of men. Aphrodite, too, was honored by similar means. To women during this time period, the thought of Aphrodite's attitude toward males was comforting as she refused to answer to any mortal man, exhibiting the control that mortal women desired to have in their own lives.

Religious teachings on gender-related issues

Abortion 
Women choosing to or not choosing to have an abortion is one of many gender related issues among different religions. In many religions, abortion is considered immoral.

The Catholic Church recognizes conception as the beginning of a human life, thus abortion is prohibited under all circumstances. However, according to the Second Vatican Council, women who have had an abortion but are willing to commit to the right of life are ensured forgiveness.

In Hinduism, it is a woman's human duty to produce offspring, thus having an abortion is a violation of that duty. The Vedas, which are age-old sacred Sanskrit texts, suggests that abortion is more sinful than killing a priest or one's own parents. The practice of a woman having an abortion is deemed as unacceptable in the Hindu community, both socially and morally.

On the other hand, some religions recognize that abortion is acceptable only in some circumstances. Mormons believe the act of having an abortion is troublesome and destructive; however, health risks and complications, rape, and closely mating with relatives are the only situations in which abortion is not considered a sin.

Homosexuality 

Homosexuality is expressly forbidden in many religions, but typically in casuistic rather than apodictic laws. As such, the rationale for such proscriptions is not clearly evident, though avoidance of procreation and contribution to society via establishing families are sometimes offered as pragmatic considerations.

In general, homosexuality is perceived as sinful in conservative movements, while fully accepted in liberal movements. For example, the Southern Baptist Christian denomination  and Islamic community consider homosexuality a sin, whereas the American Baptist denomination perceives homosexuality on an inclusive scale.

Transgender identities

Paganism and Neo-paganism 
Many Pagan religions place an emphasis on female divine energy which is manifested as The Goddess. The consensus is unclear on what is considered female and male. During PantheaCon in 2011, a group of Dianic Wiccans performing an all-female ritual turned away trans-women from joining due to their concept of women as capable of experiencing menstruation and childbirth.

Other pagans, however, have embraced a multitude of gender identities by worshiping transgender, intersex, and queer gods from antiquity, such as Greek god, Hermaphroditus.

Religious support for gender equality 
Some religions, religious scholars and religious persons have argued that "gender inequality" exists either generally or in certain instances, and have supported a variety of remedies.

Sikhs believe in equality of men and women. Gender equality in Sikhism is exemplified by the following quote from Sikh holy scriptures: “From woman, man is born; within woman, man is conceived; to a woman he is engaged and married. Woman becomes his friend; through woman, the future generations come. When his woman dies, he seeks another woman; to woman he is bound. So why call her bad from whom kings are born. From woman, woman is born; without woman, there would be no one at all." – Translated into English from Gurmukhi, Siri Guru Nanak Sahib in Raag Aasaa,  Siri Guru Granth Sahib pp 473

Pierre Chaunu has argued that the influence of Christianity promotes equality for women.

Priyamvada Gopal, of Churchill College, Cambridge, argues that increased gender equality is indeed a product of Judeo-Christian doctrine, but not exclusive to it. She expresses concern that gender equality is used by western countries as a rationale for "neocolonialism". Jamaine Abidogun argues that Judeo-Christian influence has indeed shaped gender roles in Nigeria (a strongly Christianised country); however, she doesn't consider feminism to be a product of Judeo-Christian doctrine, but rather a preferable form of "neocolonialism".

Gender patterns in religious observance 
In studies pertaining to gender patterns in religions, it has been widely accepted that females are more likely to be religious than males. In 1997, statistics gathered by Beit-Hallahmi and Argyle theorized this phenomenon into three primary causes. The first explanation is that women feel emotions at greater heights than men do, thus women tend to turn to religion more in times of high emotions such as gratitude or guilt. The second explanation is that female socialization is more likely to align with values that are commonly found in religion such as conflict mediation, tenderness, and humility. In contrast, male socialization is more likely to emphasize rebellion, thus making the guideline aspects of religion less appealing. The third explanation, which is also the most recent theory, is that females are more likely to be able to identify with religion as a natural consequence of societal structures. For example, since a majority of religions emphasize women as caretakers of the home, the societal expectation of women to take greater responsibility than men for the upbringing of a child makes religion an appealing commitment. Another example is that traditionally, men tend to work outside the home whereas women tend to work inside the home, which corresponds to studies that have shown that people are more likely to be religious when working inside of their homes.

The Pew Research Center studied the effects of gender on religiosity throughout the world, finding that women are generally more religious than men, yet the gender gap is greater for Christians than Muslims.

Specific religions 
More information on the role of gender in specific religions can be found on the following pages:

 Baháʼí Faith – Baháʼí Faith and gender equality
 Buddhism – Women in Buddhism
 Christianity – Women in Christianity
 Mormonism – Women and Mormonism
 Hinduism – Women in Hinduism
 Islam – Women in Islam
 Judaism – Gender and Judaism, Women in Judaism
 Sikhism – Women in Sikhism

See also 
Thealogy aka Feminine divine
Religion and sexuality
Sex segregation
Transgender people and religion
 Anti-gender movement

References

External links

Is Christianity an Inherently Feminine Religion? Brett and Kate McKay
Women in the Bible by the Atheist Foundation of Australia Inc.

 
Feminism and spirituality